Raja Nandini is a 1958 Telugu-language film, produced by M. Ramakrishna Rao and Midde Jagannatha Rao under the Jalaruha Productions banner and directed by Vedantam Raghavayya. It stars N. T. Rama Rao and Anjali Devi, with music composed by T. V. Raju.

Plot
Tirumala Nayaka (Rajanala) and Ramaraju (Gummadi) are neighborhood kings who are rivals. Tirumala Nayaka has a daughter Sridevi (Girija). Vimala (G. Varalakshmi) daughter of a saint takes care of Sridevi after the death of her mother. Tirumala Nayaka gives shelter to a robber Bhupathi (Mahankali Venkaiah). Ramaraju's son Jayachandra (N. T. Rama Rao) wants to make peace with Tirumala Nayaka so that they can get rid of Bhupathi. Bhupathi's nephew Kiriti (R. Nageswara Rao) and daughter Ramani (Anjali Devi) know about this and they feel that Ramaraju and Tirumala Nayaka are planning to come together. Hence they plan to attack the fort of Tirumala Nayaka. Jayachandra fails in his attempt, but on the request of Vimala, he meets Sridevi secretly. At the same time, Bhupati and Kiriti attack the fort and capture Tirumala Nayaka along with Sridevi, Vimala and Jaya Chandra. Ramani and Sridevi both love Jayachandra. when Ramani expresses her love to him, he rejects her because she is the daughter of a thief. Gajapati (Relangi), follower of Raja Guruvu Sadananda Swamy (K. V. S. Sarma) in disguise makes friendship with Bhupathi and Kiriti to grab their secrets. After knowing that the fort has gone into the hands of Bhupathi, Sadananda Swamy tries to save him with his disciples, but he fails; Tirumala Nayaka is hanged by Bhupathi. Vimala wants to take revenge over this, so, she traps Bhupathi and kills him.  Next day in the court, Ramani hears the explanation given by Vimala and changes her mindset. She gives back the kingdom and makes Sridevi as queen. In the court, Jayachandra praises the honesty of Ramani and accepts her love when Sridevi feels jealous and tries to kill Ramani, but by mistake, Vimala dies. Sridevi throws the blame on Ramani and mixes up hands with Kiriti who loves Ramani. With the help of Gajapathi, Ramani and Jayachandra escape from the fort and reach their kingdom. Everyone thinks Ramani is Sridevi and accepts their marriage. Meanwhile, Sridevi sends a letter to Ramaraju that Ramani has killed Vimala. Ramaraju asks Ramani to leave the fort. Jayachandra also comes out of the fort in search of Ramani. Meanwhile, Gajapathi reaches Ramaraju and reveals the truth. Then Ramaraju realizes his mistake and understands the eminence of Ramani. On the way, Kiriti and Sridevi catch Ramani and Jaya Chandra runs after them. Jayachandra stamps out Kiriti and when Sridevi tries to kill Ramani, unfortunately, she only dies. At last, Ramaraju reaches there and accepts Ramani as his daughter-in-law and praises her Raja Nandini. Finally, the movie ends on a happy note with the marriage of Jayachandra and Ramani.

Cast
N. T. Rama Rao as Jaya Chandra
Anjali Devi as Ramani
Rajanala as Tirumala Nayaka
Gummadi as Ramaraju 
Relangi as Gajapathi
R. Nageswara Rao as Kireeti
Mahankali Venkaiah as Bhupathi
K. V. S. Sharma as Raja Guruvu Sadananda Swamy
G. Varalakshmi as Vimala
Krishna Kumari as Menaka
Girija as Sridevi
Hemalatha as Maharani Sumitra Devi

Soundtrack

Music was composed by T. V. Raju. Lyrics were written by Malladi Ramakrishna Sastry. Playback singers are A. M. Rajah, M. S. Rama Rao, Pithapuram Nageswara Rao, Jikki and P. Susheela.	

Music released by Audio Company.

References

Films based on Indian folklore
Films directed by T. V. Raju